Miguel Alemán Velasco (born 18 March 1932 in Veracruz) is a Mexican politician, businessman and philanthropist. He is a former senator and governor of Veracruz.  Alemán Velasco is the son of former Mexican president Miguel Alemán Valdés (1946–52), the first candidate to run for the presidency from the Institutional Revolutionary Party and first civilian president in the modern era, and Beatriz Velasco Mendoza. Alemán Velasco has been active in both the public and private sectors.

Education
Alemán Velasco holds a bachelor's degree in Law from the National Autonomous University of Mexico.

Career
His father's holdings in the large Mexican television network Televisa led to Alemán Velasco's importance in that media company.

On 9 August 2004, Alemán was honored by the Government of Panama with the Great Cross of Vasco Nuñez de Balboa.

In November 2013 Alemán received the "Jerusalem Prize", which since 2002 has been awarded by the World Zionist Organization in conjunction with the Zionist Council of Mexico. President Miguel Alemán Valdés sent weapons to Israel via Panama when he was Interior Secretary (1940–1945) and the younger Alemán has had a long relationship with Israel and many Jewish friends.

He sought his party's nomination for the 2006 presidential election during the first months of 2005.

In April 2020, the Tax Administration Service (SAT) seized the property of the Miguel Alemán Valdés Foundation in Polanco, Mexico City. Alemán Velasco is the CEO of Grupo Alemán (Galem), which includes Interjet. The airline declared "technical bankruptcy" in August 2019 due to poor investments, including those in the Mexico City Texcoco Airport (NAIM). Interjet suspended its flights on 24 March 2020, in response to the COVID-19 pandemic in Mexico. Interjet and SAT reached an agreement on payment of the MXN $549.3 million debt on 23 April 2020.

Family life
He is married to former Miss Universe and actress Christiane Magnani and has four children: Claudia, Mónica, Karla and Miguel Alemán Magnani. When Alemán Velasco sold his stakes at Televisa, his son acquired them and is now the owner of Interjet, a low-fares airline.

Further reading

There have been campaign biographies and some journalistic publications on President Alemán (1946-1952), but no scholarly study. The best work is George S. Wise, El México de Alemán (1952). Useful material is contained in Oscar Lewis's chapter "Mexico since Cárdenas" in Richard N. Adams and others, Social Change in Latin America Today (1960); in Howard F. Cline, Mexico: Revolution to Evolution, 1940-1960 (1963); and in Frank Brandenburg, The Making of Modern Mexico (1964). General discussions of the Alemán administration may be found in Harry Bernstein, Modern and Contemporary Latin America (1952); in Hubert Herring, A History of Latin America (1955; 3d ed. 1968); and in Helen Miller Bailey and Abraham P. Nasatir, Latin America: The Development of Its Civilization (1960; 2d ed. 1968).

References

External links
 esmas.com: Miguel Aleman
 Official website
 Revista Líderes Mexicanos: Miguel Alemán
 Miguel Aleman

1932 births
Living people
Politicians from Veracruz
People from Veracruz (city)
Institutional Revolutionary Party politicians
Presidents of the Senate of the Republic (Mexico)
Governors of Veracruz
National Autonomous University of Mexico alumni
Children of presidents of Mexico
Miguel Aleman Velasco